A Southern accent term usually refers to either:
 Southern American English
 English in Southern England
 Southern Accent (newspaper), the weekly student-run newspaper at Southern Adventist University